Nicolaas Jouwe (24 November 1923 – 16 September 2017) was a Papuan leader who was selected to be vice president of the New Guinea Council that governed the Dutch colony of Netherlands New Guinea. As the president of the New Guinea Council was the Dutch civil servant Frits Sollewijn Gelpke, Jouwe was the highest ranking Papuan politician in the colony.

During Japanese occupation, He alongside Johan Ariks, Frans Kaisiepo and Markus Kaisiepo were member of Japanese Kenpeitai. In 1945 he was listed as among the students in school of bestuur in Kota NICA (Jayapura), which became the first generation of Papuan elites. Among the school students were Frans Kaisiepo, Lukas Rumkoren, Yan Waromi, Cornelis Krey, Marthen Indey, Silas Papare, G. Saweri, Samuel D. Kawab.  On 31 August 1945, during Queen Wilhelminna birthday celebration in Bosnik (East Biak), Jouwe, which at the time was known as Indonesian nationalist, alongside Corinus Krey, Frans Kaisiepo, Marcus Kaisiepo alongside others was meeting in Lukas Rumkorem’s house and instead celebrate Indonesian independence ceremony. He was also a member of Komite Indonesia Merdeka (KIM), a branch of organisation supporting indonesian independence in Abepura from Melbourne, although he would later quit after it became Partai Indonesia Merdeka (PIM).

After Frans Kaisiepo used his participation in Malino Conference to popularise the name "Irian", Dutch authorities did not send any Papuan representative in the follow up Denpasar Conference which was held from 7–24 December 1946, even though on 12 December 1946, Nicolaas Jouwe, Marthen Indey, and Corinus Krey protested this decision and sent a telegram to van Mook in Denpasar to oppose the formation of the State of East Indonesia as Western New Guinea was not eventually included under pressure of Dutch Catholic Party, although van Mook claimed that financial and ethnic issues were the reason. In 1947, Jouwe and Markus Kaisiepo were involved in a disagreement with PKII leader, Silas Papare, which led Papare to move to Java. 

In a broader effort to dissociate Papua elite movement with the broader Indonesian movement, Dutch colonial authority remove Colonel Abdulkadir Widjojoatmodjo and began to persuade educated papuan elites to change side, among them Nicolaas Jouwe. In 1949, he was listed among the delegations in Round Table Conference in Den Haag, he was the representative for BFOs for New Guinea. In 1951 he was among the papuan leaders that opposed Indonesian efforts to integrate West Irian. He was among the founding member of Gerakan Persatuan Nieuw Guinea (GPNG).  

In 1961 he was selected to be vice president of the New Guinea Council. In 1962, After the colony was ceded to the United Nations Temporary Executive Authority in October 1962 and subsequently to Indonesia six months later, he left New Guinea for the Netherlands, where he settled in the town of Delft. He vowed never to return to his native land if it were still occupied by Indonesia. According to his memoir, on 16 September 1962, he was invited to a secret meeting with John F. Kennedy to meet Sukarno. In this meeting, Kennedy convinced Jouwe that Papua's efforts to become independent was Dutch political ploy to separate Papua from Indonesia. Over the years he worked for Papuan independence in Netherlands, he became even convinced of this position combined with discriminatory practice of Dutch Foreign minister Joseph Luns toward Papuan delegation that he knew from his nephew, Marie Papare, Papuan delegation for Indonesia, these became his biggest motivation to return to Indonesia, later on. 

In October 2008, a documentary was broadcast on Dutch television about Jouwe's life. In it, he reiterated his stance not to return to Indonesian-administered Papua. In January 2009, he was invited by the Indonesian government to visit his ancestral land. He responded positively, and visited Papua in March 2009. About this visit a follow-up documentary was made by the same director. He finally returned to West Papua in 2010 to become Indonesian citizens. In the lunch that was held for Mark Davies on 12 May 2014, Australian journalist of TV SBS, Jouwe stated "I am a leader of the National Liberation Council of West Papua. I am not OPMs member. In fact, OPM was created by Netherlands officers in 1965 to coincide with the crackdown on the Indonesian Communist Party," he further added,"The Papuan youth who had been trained were then asked by the Netherlands to establish the OPM."

On 13 August 2014, Nicolaas Jouwe alongside Ondofolo Franzalbert Joku former OPM foreign minister, Nicholas Simione Messet former OPM diplomat in Sweden, Priest Lipiyus Biniluk, Contant Karma former vice governor and regional secretary, received an award from President Susilo Bambang Yudhoyono, in the form of Bintang Jasa Nararya, while former governor Abraham Octavianus Atururi received Bintang Mahaputera Utama.

Jouwe died on 16 September 2017 at age 93 in Indonesia.

References

External links
Hollanddoc.nl – Koning zonder land: documentary about Jouwe's life.
Hollanddoc.nl – Land zonder koning: documentary about Jouwe's visit to Papua and Indonesia in March 2009.

1923 births
2017 deaths
People from Jayapura
Netherlands New Guinea people
Papuan people
Dutch people of West Papuan descent
Members of the New Guinea Council
West Papuan independence activists